Gordon Kelly (born 1980s) is a Gaelic footballer who plays for the Milltown Malbay club and, from 2006 until announcing his retirement at the end of 2020, at senior level for the Clare county team.

Kelly made his debut for Clare in the 2006 National Football League and went on to become one of the longest playing defenders of his generation. He played in the 2012 Munster Senior Football Championship run to the final and the 2016 All-Ireland Senior Football Championship run to the quarter-final, as well as the run that brought promotion for Clare to Division 3 of the National Football League in 2014 and, two years later, promotion to Division 2. He played for his county until he was 37 years old.

References

1980s births
Living people
Clare inter-county Gaelic footballers
Gaelic football backs
Milltown Malbay